Edenderry is a small village and townland in County Down, Northern Ireland. It lies on the bank of the River Lagan near the southern edge of Belfast. In the 2001 Census it had a population of 252. Its main source of employment for its people is work in nearby towns and cities, such as Belfast.

References 

NI Neighbourhood Information System

External links 
History of Edenderry Village
Edenderry Village Past and Present

Villages in County Down
Townlands of County Down
Civil parish of Drumbo